"Boule de flipper" is a song by French model, actress and singer Corynne Charby. It was initially released in 1986 as a single and later appeared on her album Toi issued in 1987.

The song debuted at number 39 in France during the week of 20 September 1986, climbing to number 17 four weeks later.

Composition 
The song was written by Jean-Michel Bériat and Daniel Bevilacqua (Christophe) and produced by Franck Yvy.

Track listing 
7" single (Polydor 885 019-7)
 "Boule de flipper" (3:50)
 "J'sais pas quoi dire" (3:50)

Cover versions 
 Leslie on her album Futur 80 (2007); her version was released as a promotional single

Charts

References 

Corynne Charby songs
1986 songs
1986 singles
Songs written by Christophe (singer)
Polydor Records singles